Living in Paradise may refer to:

Vivre au paradis, aka Living in Paradise, a 1998 Algerian film
Living in Paradise, a 1988 album by Fattburger
Living in Paradise, a 2004 album by Jesse Colin Young
"Living in Paradise", song by Elvis Costello from This Year's Model